The J. C. Van Horne Bridge is a Canadian steel through truss/steel deck truss bridge crossing the Restigouche River between Campbellton, New Brunswick, and Pointe-à-la-Croix, Quebec.

Built between June 1958 and October 1961, the bridge was opened to traffic on October 15, 1961. As an interprovincial crossing, the bridge was constructed under a three-party agreement between the governments of Canada, New Brunswick, and Quebec.

Measuring 805 m (2641.07 ft) in total length, the bridge consists of four deck-truss approach-spans joined in the middle with a cantilever-through-truss structure. The middle structure is composed of two anchor spans and one clear span over the navigational channel measuring 380 m (1246.71 ft). It carries two traffic lanes and two sidewalks.

History
Crossing the Restigouche River between Campbellton, New Brunswick, and Pointe-à-la-Croix, Quebec, had long been a bone of contention by locals in both provinces. A federally-funded interprovincial ferry service between the two communities had proven adequate until the 1950s, when vehicle traffic began to grow at much higher rate than had been forecast.

By the late 1950s, the local New Brunswick PC Member of Parliament J.C. Van Horne made the case for a bridge and invited representatives from the federal and provincial governments to witness a "typical weekend" lineup at the ferry. Van Horne had chosen the St. John's weekend (on or around July 26) in which the lineups would be predictably long on both sides. The government representatives were convinced of the need for a bridge to replace the ferry service and acceded to Van Horne's wishes. The bridge was later named in his honour.

Gallery

See also 
 List of bridges in Canada

References

Bridges completed in 1961
Road bridges in Quebec
Road bridges in New Brunswick
Buildings and structures in Gaspésie–Îles-de-la-Madeleine
Buildings and structures in Restigouche County, New Brunswick
Transport in Campbellton, New Brunswick
Transport in Gaspésie–Îles-de-la-Madeleine
Transport in Restigouche County, New Brunswick
Steel bridges in Canada